Songs of Darkness, Words of Light is the eighth album from 2004 by the British doom metal band My Dying Bride. This album marks the debut of keyboardist Sarah Stanton. Initial copies of the album came in a hard clamshell case and featured a double sided poster and a fridge magnet as extras. This tradition was continued for the next album, A Line of Deathless Kings.

Track listing

Credits
 Aaron Stainthorpe - vocals
 Andrew Craighan - guitar
 Hamish Glencross - guitar
 Adrian Jackson - bass
 Sarah Stanton - keyboards
 Shaun Taylor-Steels - drums

References

2004 albums
My Dying Bride albums
Peaceville Records albums